Pedro de Calabria (active 17121725) was an Italian painter of the Baroque period.

He was born in Naples, where he was a pupil of Luca Giordano, whom he accompanied to assist in his works at Madrid. He painted battle-pieces.

References

18th-century Neapolitan people
18th-century Italian painters
Italian male painters
Italian battle painters
Italian Baroque painters
Painters from Naples
18th-century Italian male artists